Hypasteroceras is an extinct genus of cephalopod belonging to the ammonite subclass.

References

Jurassic ammonites
Fossils of British Columbia
Sinemurian life
Arietitidae
Ammonitida genera